Turkish Afghans are citizens of Turkey and non-citizen residents born in or with ancestors from Afghanistan. This group is part of the larger Afghan diaspora around the world. According to latest reports, there are around 129,323 Afghan refugees and asylum seekers in Turkey. The government of Turkey claims that the total Afghan population in its country is around 300,000. At the same time others have mentioned a total of 420,000. This number likely includes citizens, legal residents, visitors, and the aforementioned refugees and asylum seekers. The reason for the different numbers is that there is no proper way to count undocumented foreign nationals in a country. Another reason may be that these countries are simply making up numbers for their own political purposes.

The ones who are refugees or asylum seekers are protected from forceful deportation by the well-established non-refoulement principle and the U.N. Convention Against Torture. Like many other migrants, the Afghans often use Turkey as a place of temporary residence to meet overseas family members, relatives and friends. Many others are en route to the European Union (EU) for the purpose of applying for asylum in countries such as Germany and the United Kingdom. Some wealthy ones stay in Turkey on a temporary basis to be smuggled by airlines to as far away as North America. Meanwhile, those found in violation of law are often sent back to Afghanistan.

History
Afghan soldiers were sent by King Amanhullah to help fight against the invading armies and assist Ataturk's fight for freedom. Afghan migration to Turkey dates back to the Soviet invasion of Afghanistan, when large amounts of Afghans came into Turkey. However, no proper records were kept during the period and due to the obscure state of irregular migration to Turkey, maintaining accurate statistics of Afghan migration has been difficult. In 2002, an article by the Turkish newspaper Hurriyet claimed there were "thousands" of Afghans living throughout the country.

Recent migration

Afghans are one of the largest irregular migrant groups in Turkey. From the period 2003–2007, the number of Afghans apprehended were significant, with statistics almost doubling during the last year. Most had fled the War in Afghanistan. In 2005, refugees from Afghanistan numbered 300 and made a sizeable proportion of Turkey's registered migrants. Most of them were spread out over satellite cities with Van and Ağrı being the most specific locations. In the following years, the number of Afghans entering Turkey greatly increased, second only to migrants from Iraq; in 2009, there were 16,000 people designated under the Iraq-Afghanistan category. Despite a dramatic 50 percent reduction by 2010, reports confirmed hundreds living and working in Turkey. As of January 2010, Afghans consisted one-sixth of the 26,000 remaining refugees and asylum seekers. By mid-2021, their total number surged up to 200,000. The President of Turkey stated in August 2021 that there were a total of 300,000 Afghans in Turkey. At the same time France 24 inflated that number to 420,000.

See also
 Afghanistan–Turkey relations
 Embassy of Afghanistan, Ankara
 Turks in Afghanistan

References

External links
Over 500 migrants intercepted in Turkey (July 30, 2021)

 
Turkey
Asian diaspora in Turkey